Holborn Hill is a street and a ward in the town of Millom, in Cumbria, England. Historically it was a village in the administrative county of Cumberland and predates Millom. In 2001 the population of the ward was 2,562, living in 1,083 households, reducing at the 2011 Census to a population of 2,461, living in 1,061 households.

History
Holborn Hill was once an important place for travellers crossing the Duddon Estuary on their way up the west Cumbrian coast. Evidence of one of the coaching inns, the Pilot Inn, can still be seen in the form of an inscription on a block of houses near the junction of Holborn Hill and Newton Terrace.  The inscription reads:

Millom railway station was formerly called Holborn Hill halt before the building of Millom new town.

The ancient monuments of Millom Castle (private) and Holy Trinity Church are about one mile from Holborn Hill via footpath or road. A charter to hold a market was granted by King Henry III of England to John de Huddleston, Lord of Millom in 1251 and the market was held at Holborn Hill. A charter for a fair at the feast of Holy Trinity was also granted at the same time.

External links
Comprehensive profile
Local community website
Map link
 More on Millom

References

Populated coastal places in Cumbria
Millom